The Kensington Arcade is a shopping centre in Kensington, London, England. It is located on Kensington High Street. The entrance to High Street Kensington tube station is within The Kensington Arcade.

History

In August 2000 it was revealed that MEPC plc was planning to sell its shopping centres, including Kensington Arcade, so the money can be reinvested in its business parks in South East England. It was expected to sell for £100 million.

Meadow Partners announced that it had completed a recapitalization of Kensington Arcade, costing £100 million, in March 2011. Meadow Partners also asked Paul Davis + Partners to look at the redevelopment of Kensington Arcade. Planning permission was obtained to combine the two shopping units.

In April 2013, Wasabi and Bill's Restaurant took two stores in Kensington Arcade. Kamps, a German bakery chain, opened two stores in London in 2013 - one on Tottenham Court Road and the other in Kensington Arcade.

See also
List of shopping centres in the United Kingdom
Westfield London - a nearby shopping centre
Royal Arcade, London
Piccadilly Arcade
Sicilian Avenue
Woburn Walk
Leadenhall Market

References

External links

Shopping centres in the Royal Borough of Kensington and Chelsea
Kensington